The 1998–99 Australia Tri-Nation Series (more commonly known as the 1998–99 Carlton and United Series) was a One Day International (ODI) cricket tri-series where Australia played host to England and Sri Lanka. Australia and England reached the Finals, which Australia won 2–0.

Squads

Points table

Group stage

1st Match

2nd Match

3rd Match

4th Match

5th Match

6th Match

7th Match

8th Match

9th Match

10th Match

11th Match

12th Match

13th Match

14th Match

15th Match

Final series
Australia won the best of three final series against England 2–0.

1st Final

2nd Final

External links
 Series home at Cricinfo

References

Australian Tri-Series
1998–99 Australian cricket season
1999 in Australian cricket
1999 in English cricket
1999 in Sri Lankan cricket
1998-99
International cricket competitions from 1997–98 to 2000
1999